The Misteriosa Bank is a submerged bank or atoll in the Caribbean Sea, located at  – approximately equidistant from Mexico, Honduras and Cuba.

Geographical data
Immediately south of it is Rosario Bank. The closest piece of land is the Swan Islands, Honduras,  to the south and separated from it by the more than  Cayman Trough. It is part of the Cayman Ridge.

History
The bank was first reported by Spanish navigator Tomás Nicolás de Villa in April 1787.

In the 19th century Charles Darwin mentioned the Misteriosa Bank as an example of the sharply declining coral reef in his work Coral Reefs:

Currently a buoy has been anchored to the seabed of this submerged peak of a sea mountain range that appears to have been claimed by the Principality of New Utopia. The placing of the buoy was filmed by a German film crew and broadcast by Arte television on satellite.
New Utopia maintains no state claims and wants to build a form of micronation on top of it, using concrete blocks.

See also
Placer (geography)

References

External links
 NASA picture showing Misteriosa Bank
 Escafandra - El misterio de la "Isla Misteriosa" IIa parte

Landforms of the Cayman Islands
Atolls of the North Atlantic Ocean
Atolls of the United Kingdom